Rashid Naseer (born 4 March 1986 in Muzaffarabad, Azad Kashmir), is a Pakistani cricketer.

Domestic career
Naseer made his debut for AJK Jaguars against Peshawar Panthers in the 2014–15 National T20 Cup. He got a score of 4 and didn't bowl as Peshawar won by 9 wickets. In 2021, Naseer was selected by Overseas Warriors during the 2021 KPL draft in the emerging category. He didn't play in any match as Overseas Warriors went on to get knocked out in the 1st eliminator.

References

External links
 
 Rashid Naseer at Pakistan Cricket Board

1986 births
Living people
Pakistani cricketers
People from Azad Kashmir